"Taiyō to Sabaku no Bara"/"Subeki Koto" is the forty-first single by the Japanese band Tokio. It was the first single released by Tokio in eleven months, having been released on August 19, 2009. The single reached third place on the Oricon charts and charted for three weeks. The song "Taiyō to Sabaku no Bara" is used as the theme song to the drama show Karei Naru Spy. The song "Subeki Koto" is currently being used as the ending theme song to 5LDK, a talk show hosted by Tokio.

Track listing
"Taiyō to Sabaku no Bara / Subeki Koto" was released in three different versions:

CD Normal Edition

Limited Edition A

Limited Edition B

References

2009 singles
Tokio (band) songs
Japanese television drama theme songs
J Storm singles

2009 songs